Sri Siddhartha Institute of Technology (SSIT) is a university located in Tumkur, Karnataka, India. Sri Siddhartha Institute of Technology was established by the Siddhartha Education Society.

History
SSIT is managed by the Sri Siddhartha Education Society, which was founded in 1979.

The late Sri H.M. Gangadharaiah, a staunch Gandhian and Buddhist, established the Sri Siddhartha Education Society in 1979 with the blessings of the father of Bhoodhan movement, "Saint Vinobha Bhave," with the objective of providing education to the student community from rural areas and backward classes. Since then it is led by Dr. G. Shivaprasad, an ophthalmologist and Dr. G. Parameshwara, a doctorate in agriculture from Australia.

SSES has 84 educational establishments under its aegis spread across the southern part of Karnataka, including 
 Engineering College - Sri Siddhartha Institute of Technology
 Medical College - Sri Siddhartha Medical College
 Dental College - Sri Siddhartha Dental College
 College of Education
 First grade College, TCH^College
 College of Nursing
 Junior colleges
 Training institutions
 Sanskrit schools
 Pali schools 
 High schools in several districts in Karnataka State

Its silver jubilee was celebrated in the year 1984 with the President of India, Sri Giani Zail Singh, as the chief guest.

Administration
SSIT is  maintained by Sri Siddhartha Education Society, Sri.G Parameshwar, President, KPCC is the joint secretary of the institution.

Affiliations and approvals 
The institute is an institutional of the ISTE and is recognised by the All India Council for Technical Education.

Undergraduate programs 
 Civil Engineering
 Computer Science And Engineering
 Electronics and Communication Engineering
 Electrical And Electronics Engineering
 Industrial Engineering and Management
 Information Science Engineering
 Instrumentation Technology
 Mechanical Engineering
 Telecommunication Engineering
 Medical Electronics

Postgraduate programs 
Master of Computer Applications

Master of Technology
 Thermal Power Engineering
 Digital Electronics
 Computer Science And Engineering
 CADD Structure 
 VLSI & Embedded Systems
 Computer Aided Industrial Drives
 Product Design And Manufacturing

Campus
Spread over 65 acres in Kunigal Road, Tumkur. 5 km from Tumkur city bus stand & 4 km from the railway station.

A unique geodesic dome library has more than 200,000 books.
 Central Library
 Post Graduate Block
 Scholar Block
 SSIT STEP - Science & Technology Entrepreneurs Park
 Administrative Block
 Gangadaraih Memorial Park
 Lumbini Boys Hostel
 Rajagruha Boys Hostel

College Festivals
 Kalothsava - College Fest
YANTRIK-MECHANICAL FEST    
ELECTROTEC-ECE.TCE & ML
Interface - CS, IS & MCA Fest
 Nirmaan - Civil
 Vidyuth - EEE
 Tantra
 Saamarthya
 Unicorn - IEM
 Technodea - State level project exhibition and competition

College Clubs
 varsity Circle
 Phoenix
 Nexus
 Renegades
 Black Mamba
 Brio
 Iste

References

External links 

 College website

Engineering colleges in Karnataka
Educational institutions established in 1979
Education in Tumkur
1979 establishments in Karnataka
Universities and colleges in Tumkur district